The 2018 Western & Southern Open  was a men's and women's tennis tournament played on outdoor hard courts from August 13–19, 2018. It took place at the Lindner Family Tennis Center in Mason, Ohio, a northern suburb of Cincinnati, in the United States. It was a Masters 1000 tournament on the 2018 ATP World Tour and a WTA Premier 5 tournament on the 2018 WTA Tour. The tournament was one of two headline events in the 2018 US Open Series. The 2018 tournament was the 117th men's edition and the 90th women's edition of the Cincinnati Masters.

Points and prize money

Point distribution

Prize money

ATP singles main-draw entrants

Seeds
The following are the seeded players. Seedings are based on ATP rankings as of August 6, 2018. Rankings and points before are as of August 13, 2018.

Withdrawals 
The following players would have been seeded, but they withdrew from the event.

† Fognini is entitled to use an exemption to skip the tournament and substitute his 18th best result (90 points) in its stead. Accordingly, his points after the tournament will remain unchanged.

Other entrants
The following players received wild cards into the main singles draw:
  Mackenzie McDonald 
  Andy Murray
  Frances Tiafoe
  Stan Wawrinka

The following players received entry from the singles qualifying draw:
  Marius Copil
  Hubert Hurkacz 
  Bradley Klahn
  Denis Kudla 
  Dušan Lajović  
  Daniil Medvedev 
  Michael Mmoh

The following players received entry as lucky losers:
  Guillermo García López
  Malek Jaziri

Withdrawals
Before the tournament
  Roberto Bautista Agut → replaced by  Benoît Paire
  Tomáš Berdych → replaced by  João Sousa
  Fabio Fognini → replaced by  Jérémy Chardy
  Gaël Monfils → replaced by  Márton Fucsovics
  Rafael Nadal → replaced by  Malek Jaziri
  Dominic Thiem → replaced by  Guillermo García López

Retirements
  David Goffin

ATP doubles main-draw entrants

Seeds

 Rankings are as of August 6, 2018

Other entrants
The following pairs received wildcards into the doubles main draw:
  Ryan Harrison /  Nicholas Monroe 
  Mackenzie McDonald /  Daniel Nestor

The following pair received entry as alternates:
  Leonardo Mayer /  Albert Ramos Viñolas

Withdrawals
Before the tournament
  Dominic Thiem

During the tournament
  Alexander Peya

WTA singles main-draw entrants

Seeds

 1 Rankings are as of August 6, 2018

Other entrants
The following players received wild cards into the main singles draw:
  Amanda Anisimova
  Victoria Azarenka
  Svetlana Kuznetsova
  Bethanie Mattek-Sands
  Markéta Vondroušová

The following player received entry using a protected ranking:
  Serena Williams

The following players received entry from the singles qualifying draw:
  Ana Bogdan 
  Alizé Cornet
  Kaia Kanepi 
  Allie Kiick 
  Viktória Kužmová 
  Varvara Lepchenko
  Tatjana Maria 
  Petra Martić  
  Rebecca Peterson 
  Aliaksandra Sasnovich 
  Ajla Tomljanović 
  Stefanie Vögele

The following player received entry as a lucky loser:
  Camila Giorgi

Withdrawals
Before the tournament
  Mihaela Buzărnescu → replaced by  Danielle Collins
  Dominika Cibulková → replaced by  Tímea Babos
  Maria Sharapova → replaced by  Kateřina Siniaková
  Venus Williams → replaced by  Camila Giorgi
  Zhang Shuai → replaced by  Aleksandra Krunić

Retirements
  Caroline Wozniacki

WTA doubles main-draw entrants

Seeds

 Rankings are as of August 6, 2018

Other entrants
The following pairs received wildcards into the doubles main draw:
  Jennifer Brady /  Caroline Dolehide 
  Lauren Davis /  Nicole Gibbs

The following pair received entry as alternates:
  Kaitlyn Christian /  Sabrina Santamaria

Withdrawals
Before the tournament
  Ashleigh Barty

Retirements
  Bethanie Mattek-Sands

Champions

Men's singles

  Novak Djokovic def.  Roger Federer, 6–4, 6–4

Women's singles

  Kiki Bertens def.  Simona Halep, 2–6, 7–6(8–6), 6–2

Men's doubles

  Jamie Murray /  Bruno Soares def.  Juan Sebastián Cabal /  Robert Farah, 4–6, 6–3, [10–6]

Women's doubles

  Lucie Hradecká /  Ekaterina Makarova def.  Elise Mertens /  Demi Schuurs, 6–2, 7–5

References

External links
 

 
2018 ATP World Tour
2018 WTA Tour
2018
Cincinnati
August 2018 sports events in the United States